Afrihost is a South African Internet Service Provider (ISP) providing a number of services, including ADSL broadband, fibre, fixed wireless, mobile services and web hosting. A proposed merger with Cool Ideas, another ISP, has been approved by regulators.

The company was established in 2000 by CEO Gian Visser, Brendan Armstrong and Peter Meintjes, who were later joined by Greg Payne (former COO of Internet Solutions). Originally a web hosting and general IT services company, the firm joined the broadband market in 2009. The original executives have since been joined by Angus MacRobert, former CEO of Internet Solutions and joint CEO of Vox Telecom. Dean Suchard, formerly CFO of Dimension Data, joined the board as Financial Director in 2016.

Services 

In 2000, Afrihost offered web hosting services. As of 2018, it is a broadband and telecoms service provider as well, which offers ADSL, VDSL, broadband, fiber-to-the-home, mobile voice and mobile data services.

In 2011, Afrihost acquired Axxess, an ISP founded in 1997 which offers FTTH (Fibre) Internet services through most service providers including OpenServe and Vumatel.

MTN Group's purchase and sale of stake in Afrihost 

In 2014, MTN Group purchased 50.02% of Afrihost's shares for R408 million. However, in 2016, MTN Group sold its stake in Afrihost.

Accomplishments 

In 2017, Afrihost won various industry awards for its Fibre and ADSL offerings, as well as for its customer care.

See also 
 Internet in South Africa

References

External links 
 The Afrihost Story

Telecommunications companies of South Africa
Internet service providers of Africa
Companies based in Johannesburg
Internet service providers of South Africa